Spatika Lingam or Crystal Lingam or Crystal Shivling is a type of Lingam made from quartz. Spatika Lingam is called sphatika Sivalingam 
(Kannada -ಸ್ಪಟಿಕ ಲಿಂಗ), (Tamil - ஸ்படிகக்கல் லிங்கம்), (Telugu-స్పటిక లింగం). Sphatikam in Sanskrit means "made of crystal, crystalline", referring to quartz and alum.

Sphatikam 
Sphatikam is a semi-precious gemstone. There are many different varieties of sphatikam. High quality quartz crystals are single-crystal silica with optical or electronic properties that make them suitable for hardstone carvings. The Hindu temples in South India use this semi-precious mineral for making Shiva Lingams. Sphatikam beads are made from translucent rose quartz are cut and polished as beads. Each bead is about ten millimeters in diameter. It is good conductor of heat. Hence people wear sphatikam jewelry (mala) to keep their body cool. Some other people claim that these beads have healing properties.

Sphatika Lingam in scriptures
In Hindu Shiva temples, Saiva Agamas(Shaivism's Agamas) allows worshiping Lord Shiva in the form of Sphatika Lingam or Crystal Lingam. The Saiva Agamas says "one can worship this Great God Shiva in the form of a Lingam made of mud or sand, of cow dung or wood, of bronze or black granite stone. But the purest and most sought-after form is the quartz crystal (Sphatika), a natural stone not carved by man but made by nature, gathered molecule by molecule over hundreds, thousands or millions of years, grown as a living body grows, but infinitely more slowly. Such a creation of nature is itself a miracle worthy of worship."

Sphatika Lingam in Temples
Sphatika Lingam is representing the icon of Lord Nataraja. The Sphatika Lingams are protected in the sanctum sanctorum of Lord Shiva. Hindu priests offer milk, water, or vibhuti abhisheka to the Sphatika Lingam. They also chant 108 times Shiva Panchakshari Mantra . It is believed that Sphatika Lingam removes all curses and negative karma and will enhance ones confidence and power.

Digambar Ashram Asni, Fatehpur, Uttar Pradesh, India 
Digambar Ashram is located in Asni Village of Fatehpur district in Uttar Pradesh. There is a temple inside Digambar Ashram where a rhinestone Shivling is stated. The name of Shivling is "Swatmanandeshwar Mahadev ji". The Shivling weighs 15 kg  it is 16 inches in diameter and is 10 inches tall.

Thillai Nataraja swamy Temple, Chidambaram
Thillai Nataraja swamy Temple, Chidambaram is considered as one of the most ancient and most celebrated of Shiva temples in India. Saivites attach great religious as well as historic and cultural significance with this temple. In this temple Lord Shiva is an embodiment of the infinite space. Chidambaram temple is associated with Lord Nataraja, or Shiva in his Ananda Tandava pose (the Cosmic Dance of bliss) in the cosmic golden hall (Ponnambalam) and the hall of consciousness (Chit Sabha). Lord Shiva is also worshipped in this temple as "formless form" and this fact is being understood as Chidambara Rahasyam. This temple is known for its Akasa Lingam, an embodiment of Shiva as the formless Space.The Hindu monk Adi Sankara is said to have presented a Sphatika Lingam which is still under worship in this temple. This Sphatika Lingam, instituted at Chitsabha, is being represented as Lord Chandramauleeswara (A form of Lord Shiva). Also in the Chitsabha are images of Ratnasabhapati (Nataraja of Ruby), Swarnakarshana Bhairavar, Mukhalingam etc.

Kadavul Temple, Kauai, Hawaii, USA
Kadavul HinduTemple is a traditional Sri Lankan style temple dedicated to Lord Shiva  and was established in 1973 in Kauai, Hawaii, USA. 

Lord Shiva is enshrined in the main sanctum in the form of Nataraja and a crystal Sivalingam. In front of Shiva's sanctum is a 300-kg, 3-foot-tall, naturally formed sphatika Sivalingam, believed to be the largest six-sided, single-pointed crystal ever found..  
This Shiva Lingam is being temporarily installed in Kadavul HinduTemple, where a ruby-red, low-power laser beam illumines it. In future this Saptika lingam would be housed in the hand-carved white granite Iraivan Temple. There is a black 16 Ton Nandi (bull) carved from a single stone in front of pavilion standing on redwood timber pavilion. Six-foot-tall black granite Murti of Lord Ganesha and Lord Kartikeya are installed in two side shrines. Moreover, lining the main walls of the temple is a rare collection of Shiva's 108 tandava dance poses in 16-inch-tall bronze icons covered with gold leaf. The shrine for the temple's founder, Satguru Sivaya Subramuniyaswami was established to the right of the entry door. A small temple tank has a bronze statue of dancing Saint Sambandar.

Meenakshi Amman Temple, Madurai
Meenakshi Amman Temple is a historic Hindu temple located in the south side of river Vaigai in the temple city of Madurai, Tamil Nadu, India. It is dedicated to Parvati who is known as Meenakshi and her consort, Shiva named here as Sundareswarar(beautiful deity). The temple forms the heart and lifeline of the 2500-year-old city of Madurai.The centuries-old Sphatika Lingam held in this temple has developed cracks and hence a new six inch tall Spatika Lingam with the right specification has been brought from Himalayas. It is learned that this Lingam is worth over Rs.7.5 lakh. The new Sphatika Lingam will be the companion (Udaiyavar) to Lord Sundareswarar. The existing brass container of the Lingam will be replaced with golden container. The new silver consecration base (abhisheka peedam) weighing about 12 kg. is also getting ready for the formal consecration. The new Sphatika Lingam is getting consecrated on March 16, 2012.

Ramanathaswamy Temple, Rameshwaram

Ramanathaswamy Temple is a famous Hindu temple dedicated to Lord Shiva located in the island of Rameswaram in the state of Tamil Nadu, India. The Temple is also one of the 12 Jyothirlinga temples, where Shiva is worshipped in the form of a Jyotirlingam meaning "pillar of light". The temple is located in Rameshwaram, an island town in South India, considered a holy pilgrimage site for both Shaivites and Vaishnavites. Ramanathaswamy temple was built during the 12th century and widely expanded during the Nayak period in the late 16th century. Ramanathaswamy temple is known for its longest corridor among all Hindu temples in India.

In the first inner corridor, devotees offer worship to the venerated white Sphatika Lingam. The Sri Chakra (Sethu Peetam) and the Sphatika Lingam were instituted by the Hindu monk Adi Sankara. Sphatika lingam darshan is offered to the pilgrims during early morning hours i.e., morning between 5 and 6 am. It is a great experience. The new Sphatika lingam was presented by Jagadguru Shankaracharya Sri Sri Bharati Tirtha Mahaswami, The 36th  Shankaracharya of Dakṣināmnāya  Sringeri Sharada Peetham in February 2021.

Ekambaranathar Temple, Kanchipuram
Ekambaranathar Temple is a Saivite Hindu temple dedicated to Lord Shiva. It is located in Kanchipuram in the state of Tamil Nadu, India. Ekambaranathar Temple is the largest temple and is located in the northern part of the temple town Kanchipuram. The temple gopuram (gateway tower) is 59m tall, which is one of the tallest gopurams in India. This Saivite temple is one of the five major Shiva temples or Pancha Bootha Sthalams (each representing a primordial element) representing the element - Earth.

The ursava deity Lord Ekambareswarar is seated in a glass sanctum sactorum with a roof decorated with rudraksha beads. Just in front of this shrine on the corridor, there another shrine with Sphatika Lingam along with the vehicle Nandi (Holy Bull). Offering prayer to this Sphatika Lingam will bring better appearance, confidence and fair thinking.

Swetharanyeswarar Temple, Thiruvenkadu
Swetharanyeswarar Temple is the Hindu Shiva temple located in the town of Thiruvenkadu near Sirkazhi. The prime deity is Lord Swetharanyeswarar (lord of white forest) or Lord Shiva and His consort is goddess Brahma Vidya ambal. There is a separate Sannidhi for Bhudhan (mercury (planet). The temple is quite larger premises and all four important Saivite saints have sung hymns in praise of this lord.

This temple has one rare Sphatika Lingam. Special worship services are offered to Natarajar and the associated Sphatika Lingam, as in Chidambaram.

Sankara Narayanan temple, Sankarankovil
Sankara Narayanan temple is located in the town Sankarankovil, Tirunelveli District and 56 km away from Thirunelveli City. It was built by Ukira Pandiyan AC 900. It houses the deity by the name Sankara Narayanan, which is half - Lord Shiva and the other half - Lord Vishnu. "Adi Thabasu" is main festival at this temple. In older times, the city was called as Sankaranayinar kovil. Even now it is called as Sankaran Kovil. The deities of this temple are Sri Sankareswarar, Sri Gomathi Amman and Sri Sankara Narayanar.

Lord Shiva has agreed to perform consecration to Lord Vishnu. Therefore, consecration is performed to the Sphatika Lingam present inside the sanctum sanctorum. One view is that the Sphatika Laingam was instituted by Adi Sankara and yet another view states that the Sphatika Lingam was established by Sri Narasimha Bharathi Swamy of Shringeri Mutt.

Shri Parkasheshwar Mahadev Mandir 
Shri Parkasheshwar Mahadev Mandir is situated in the dehradun district, Uttarakhand, India. It has twin spatika lingams.

Shri Satayanarayan Mandir , Kamptee, Maharashtra 

This temple is situated in kamptee which is 16 kms away from Nagpur district, Maharashtra . The spatika lingam is surrounded by goddess pravati which is made up of silver . This temple is 150 years old and it also contains statue of Lord Krishna and Lord Satayaranayana.

References

Religious objects
Shaivism